Deitsch is a surname.  It is also a Jewish term for people from Benelux. Variants of the surname can be found in other countries like the Netherlands, as well as Germany and the United States.

People
 Fran Landesman (née Deitsch; 1927 – 2011), American poet
 Matt Deitsch (born 1997), American activist against gun violence
 Richard Deitsch, American sportswriter 
 Ryan Deitsch (born 1999), American activist against gun violence

See also 
Deutsch (disambiguation)